Macrocoma is a genus of leaf beetles in the subfamily Eumolpinae. It contains about 100 species, which are found in tropical Africa, around the Mediterranean, on the Canary Islands, in western and central Asia, and in India.

Macrocoma is closely related to the African genus Pseudocolaspis, and has sometimes been treated as a junior synonym of it historically. The two genera are distinguished by the exposure of the pygidium and the shape of the anterior edges of the prosternum: in Macrocoma, the pygidium is covered by the elytra and the anterior edges of the prosternum are flat, while in Pseudocolaspis, the pygidium is more than half-exposed and the anterior edges of the prosternum are convex. Currently, several species are not arranged according to these characters.

Species
Species include:

Renamed species:
 M. impressa (Berti & Rapilly, 1973) nec Achard, 1925: renamed to M. bertiae Moseyko, 2013

Synonyms:
 M. hormuziaca Warchałowski, 2001: synonym of M. zarudnii Lopatin, 1985

References

 
Eumolpinae
Chrysomelidae genera
Taxa named by Félicien Chapuis
Beetles of Africa
Beetles of Asia
Beetles of Europe